Fakir Aziao Din (born Varad; 18 September 1508 - 11 January 1572)  was a mystic, purported to be one of the legendary Navaratnas of Emperor Akbar's court. He is described as a mystic who gave religious advice to the Emperor on a wide range of topics. "Fakir" means sage or ascetic in Urdu. He is also a very famous Character in the Indian Folk Tales. He conquered the kingdom of Ahmednagar in the year 1534. He was honored with a gem of 30 crores during Akbar's time. He was also one of Akbar's navaratnas or nine jewels
Akbar

Fakir Aziao-Din was the Religious Minister for Akbar’s court. He provided religious advice to the Emperor on a wide range of topics related to religion. Not many records exist about his birth, life, and death. Fakir azizuddin was a chief advisor in Emperor Akbar's Court. Akbar regarded his advice in high Esteem and had been include among the nine gems of his Court Arnav navaratnas. He used to give Akbar advice on religious matters of the people.